Tonis was a Canadian Ukrainian-language pay television channel owned by Ethnic Channels Group (ECG) with its name licensed from the owners of the Ukrainian television channel, Tonis.

The channel broadcast a variety of programming primarily from Tonis including news, sports, cultural programs, and talk shows.

History

Inter+
In September 2003, Ethnic Channels Group was granted approval from the Canadian Radio-television and Telecommunications Commission (CRTC) to launch a television channel called Ukrainian TV One, described as "a national ethnic Category 2 specialty television service providing programming primarily in the Ukrainian language."

On June 23, 2004, ECG launched Inter+ using the Ukrainian TV One licence. Inter+ broadcast programming from Inter+, an international channel broadcasting programming from Inter.

Channel 5
In September 2005, ECG re-branded Inter+ as Channel 5 (in Cyrillic: “5 канал”), broadcasting programming from Channel 5, a national news network from Ukraine.

1+1 International
In June 2006, in its effort to boost subscription to the channel, ECG re-branded Channel 5 as 1+1 International which broadcast programming from 1+1 International, a Ukrainian-language TV channel from Ukraine. 1+1 International, itself, was an international channel broadcasting programming from Studio 1+1 for Ukrainian communities outside the Ukraine. The channel broadcast a variety of programming including news, documentaries, talk shows, and more.

Tonis
In the fall of 2008, the Ukrainian channel, 1+1 International, became unavailable in North America. By that time, Roger Communications, the largest Canadian television service provider at the time, had dropped the Canadian channel from its line-up due to low subscriptions. As a result of both of these situations, ECG, yet again, rebranded the channel as Tonis (in Cyrillic: “Тоніс”). The channel broadcast programming from Tonis, an information and educational channel from Ukraine.

In February 2009, both Aurora Cable and Telus TV, the only other carriers of the channel at the time, dropped the channel from their line-ups, rendering the channel no longer available.

Logos

References

External links
 Ethnic Channels Group

Defunct television networks in Canada
Multicultural and ethnic television in Canada
Television channels and stations established in 2004
Television channels and stations disestablished in 2009
Ukrainian-Canadian culture in Ontario